Giovanni Giacomo Semenza (18 July 1580 – 1638) was an Italian painter of the early Baroque period. Born in Bologna and also known as Giacomo Sementi. He was a pupil of the painter Denis Calvaert, then of Guido Reni. Among his pupils were Giacinto Brandi. He painted a Christ the Redeemer for the church of St. Catherine in Bologna.

References

Featured in the Vite.. of Giovanni Baglione. p. 230.
Cyclopedia of Painters and Paintings edited by John Denison Champlin, Charles Callahan Perkins, Volume IV, Scribner and Sons (1887): page 169.

1580 births
1638 deaths
16th-century Italian painters
Italian male painters
17th-century Italian painters
Painters from Bologna
Italian Baroque painters